Ramechhap Airport  is a domestic airport serving the municipality of Manthali, the district headquarters of Ramechhap District located in the Tamakoshi River valley in Bagmati Province in Nepal. As of October 2022, most flights to Lukla Airport are operated from Ramechhap Airport.

History

The airport was opened in October 1979. In 2015, the runway was renovated and upgraded from a grass/clay surface to concrete.

In 2019, as the sole runway of Tribhuvan International Airport in Kathmandu was being renovated and the airport was closed over night, all flights to Lukla were operated from Ramechhap Airport, the closest airport to Kathmandu, as these flights need to take off early in the morning to not get caught in dangerous winds in Lukla. During peak, the airport served 24 flights per day, However, the airport had serious problems handling the mass of tourists traveling to Lukla. Following this, plans were developed to upgrade the airport. By 2020, flights to Lukla were operated from Kathmandu again, and with Tara Air's discontinuation of the flight to Kathmandu, the airport was left without scheduled operations.

In 2022, the Civil Aviation Authority of Nepal decided that flight to Lukla were to be operated from Ramechhap Airport instead of Kathmandu again. Despite this being the second instance, critics argued that the airport and its surrounding infrastructure was still not sufficiently developed.

Facilities

Airlines and destinations

Access
The airport is located near Feeder Road 32. It is connected to Kathmandu via BP Highway.

Incidents and accidents
 22 April 2019 – A Tara Air Dornier 228 aircraft skidded off the runway upon landing at Ramechhap Airport. Due to adverse weather, the flight from Tribhuvan International Airport to Lukla Airport was diverted to Ramechhap Airport. All of the crew and passengers evacuated the aircraft safely.
 20 March 2020 – A Summit Air Let 410 en route from Lukla to Kathmandu made an emergency landing at Ramechhap Airport due to an engine failiues.  All of the crew and passengers evacuated the aircraft safely.

See also
List of airports in Nepal

References

External links
 

Airports in Nepal
Buildings and structures in Ramechhap District
1979 establishments in Nepal